Tandin Tshering  is a Bhutanese international footballer, currently playing for Druk Pol. He made his first appearance for the Bhutan national football team in 2009.

References

External links

Bhutanese footballers
Bhutan international footballers
Druk Pol F.C. players
Living people
Association football defenders
1986 births